Democratic Convention (Convention démocrate, CD) is a centrist-liberal political party in France led by Hervé de Charette. It is the continuation of the Popular Party for French Democracy, established in 1995.

The Popular Party for French Democracy (Parti populaire pour la démocratie française, PPDF) was launched in July 1995, as a successor to the Perspectives and Realities Clubs and as a component of the Union for French Democracy (UDF) centre-right confederation. Indeed, during the 1995 presidential campaign, the most part of the UDF politicians supported the Neo-Gaullist Prime Minister Edouard Balladur, against the instruction of Valéry Giscard d'Estaing, the founder and president of the UDF, who called to vote for the other Rally for the Republic (RPR) candidate Jacques Chirac. The PPDF was created to organize Giscard d'Estaing's faithfuls within the UDF (Hervé de Charette, Jean-Pierre Fourcade, Dominique Bussereau, Jean-Pierre Raffarin, Jean-François Mattéi, Pierre Albertini, Jean-François Humbert, Françoise Hostalier, Robert Hersant). Nevertheless, it could not prevent the departure of Giscard d'Estaing from the presidency of the centre-right confederation in 1996.

In 1998, the PPDF participated in the transformation of the UDF into the New UDF (from an alliance of parties to a single party), although retaining some of its autonomy and having lost some members to Liberal Democracy, including Jean-François Mattei, Jean-Pierre Raffarin and Dominique Bussereau.

In 2002 the party finally merged into the Union for a Popular Movement (UMP). The group was a faction within the UMP and adopted the new name Democratic Convention. The affiliation with the UMP of President Nicolas Sarkozy continued until 2010. In May–June 2011 the party joined The Alliance, a new centrist coalition led by Jean-Louis Borloo.

References

External links 
Official website

Political parties of the French Fifth Republic
Political parties established in 1995
Political party factions in France
Factions and associate parties of the Union for a Popular Movement